The 2013 2000 Guineas Stakes was the 205th running of the 2000 Guineas Stakes horse race. It was run over one mile at Newmarket Racecourse on 4 May 2013.

Race details
 Sponsor: QIPCO
 Winner's prize money: £226,840
 Going: Good to firm
 Number of runners: 13
 Winner's time: 1 minute, 35.84 seconds

Full result

* The distances between the horses are shown in lengths or shorter – nk = neck

Winner details
Further details of the winner, Dawn Approach:

 Foaled: 23 April 2010, in Ireland
 Sire: New Approach; Dam: Hymn Of The Dawn (Phone Trick)
 Owner: Godolphin
 Breeder: Jim Bolger

Reaction
Dawn Approach's jockey Kevin Manning said after the race: "He's a very special horse. He's done it very easy and travelled very well throughout the race." When asked about whether the colt would run in the Derby, Jim Bolger said: "He's got a fantastic temperament. He was cruising here and he's very easy to switch off in a race. If he's going to get the trip, he's got the temperament for it" and added "I don't know about the Derby, Sheikh Mohammed and myself said we would sleep on it and take it from there."

Form analysis

Two-year-old races
Notable runs by the future 2000 Guineas participants as two-year-olds in 2012:

 Dawn Approach – 1st in Coventry Stakes, Vincent O'Brien Stakes and Dewhurst Stakes
 Glory Awaits – 9th in Superlative Stakes, 4th in Autumn Stakes
 Van Der Neer – 2nd in Dewhurst Stakes
 Toronado – 1st in Winkfield Stakes and Champagne Stakes
 Cristoforo Colombo – 3rd in Coventry Stakes, 2nd in Railway Stakes, slipped up in Phoenix Stakes, 4th in Middle Park Stakes
 Garswood – 1st in Harry Rosebery Stakes, 2nd in Cornwallis Stakes
 Don't Bother Me – 6th in Solario Stakes, 5th in Killavullan Stakes
 Leitir Mor – 7th in Coventry Stakes, 2nd in Phoenix Stakes, 3rd in Curragh Stakes, 1st in Round Tower Stakes, 3rd in Vincent O'Brien Stakes, 2nd in Dewhurst Stakes
 George Vancouver – 2nd in Prix Morny, 6th in Round Tower Stakes, 3rd in Dewhurst Stakes, 1st in Breeders' Cup Juvenile Turf
 Moohaajim – 5th in Prix Morny, 1st in Mill Reef Stakes, 2nd in Middle Park Stakes

The road to Newmarket
Early-season appearances in 2013, prior to running in the 2000 Guineas:

 Glory Awaits – 4th in Feilden Stakes
 Van Der Neer – 1st in International Trial Stakes
 Toronado – 1st in Craven Stakes
 Garswood – 1st in European Free Handicap
 Don't Bother Me – 2nd in Patton Stakes, 2nd in Leopardstown 2,000 Guineas Trial Stakes
 Leitir Mor – 6th in Woodlands Stakes
 Correspondent – 4th in Greenham Stakes
 Moohaajim – 3rd in Greenham Stakes

Subsequent Group 1 wins
Group 1 / Grade I victories after running in the 2000 Guineas:
 Dawn Approach – St James's Palace Stakes (2013)
 Toronado – Sussex Stakes (2013)

Subsequent breeding careers
Leading progeny of participants in the 2013 2000 Guineas.
Dawn Approach (1st) – Musis Amica (2nd Prix De Diane 2018), Mary Tudor (3rd Irish Oaks 2018), Madhmoon (2nd Epsom Derby 2019)Toronado (4th) – Tactical (1st July Stakes 2020), Affair To Remember (3rd Australasian Oaks 2020)Garswood (7th) – Cala Tarida (1st Prix des Réservoirs 2018), Little Kim (1st Prix du Bois 2018)Don't Bother Me (8th) – Exported to AustraliaLeitir Mor (9th) – Exported to IndiaGeorge Vancouver (10th) – Sired minor flat and jumps winnersMoohaajim (12th) – Minor flat winners, exported to Denmark

References

2013 in British sport
2013 in English sport
2013 in horse racing
May 2013 sports events in the United Kingdom
2010s in Suffolk
2000 Guineas Stakes